George Harold Smith (1866 – 21 April 1936) was a Reform Party Member of Parliament in New Zealand.

Smith was born at Masterton in 1866, the son of Major J. Valentine Smith.

Smith unsuccessfully contested the Pahiatua electorate in the  against the incumbent, John O'Meara, of the Liberal Party.

He won the Pahiatua electorate in a 1916 by-election after the death of the previous MP, James Escott, and retired in 1919.

Notes

References

1866 births
1936 deaths
Reform Party (New Zealand) MPs
Unsuccessful candidates in the 1899 New Zealand general election
Unsuccessful candidates in the 1928 New Zealand general election
People from Masterton
Members of the New Zealand House of Representatives
New Zealand MPs for North Island electorates